On 4 January 2023, an al-Shabaab double car bombing killed 35 people in Mahas District, Hiran, Somalia.

Background
The Somali Civil War began in the early 1990s. Al-Shabaab are a Somali jihadist group who began an insurgency in 2006.

Bombings
On 4 January 2023, a double car bombing occurred in Mahas District in Hiran in central Somalia. The first targeted politicians' houses and the second a market. Later the same day, al-Shabaab claimed responsibility for the attacks.

See also
2023 in Somalia
List of terrorist incidents in 2023

References

2020s murders in Somalia
21st-century mass murder in Somalia
Al-Shabaab (militant group) attacks
Attacks in 2023
Car and truck bombings in Somalia
Car and truck bombings in the 2020s
Hiran, Somalia
Islamic terrorist incidents in 2023
January 2023 crimes in Africa
Mass murder in 2023
Terrorist incidents in Somalia in 2023